The 2021 Gold Coast Titans Season is the 15th season competing in the 2021 NRL season. The team is coached by Justin Holbrook who is coaching for his 2nd consecutive season. On 26 February 2021, the Titans Coach announced that Kevin Proctor and Jamal Fogarty would co-captain the Titans through 2021.

Fixtures

Pre-season

Regular season

References

Gold Coast Titans seasons
Gold Coast Titans season
2021 NRL Women's season